The 2017–18 Ligue 1 is the 59th season of top-tier football in Côte d'Ivoire. The season began on 14 October 2017 and ended on 3 June 2018.

Standings

Top goalscorers

See also
2018 Coupe de Côte d'Ivoire

References

Ligue 1 (Ivory Coast) seasons
Ivory Coast
1